Jane Bess was a German screenwriter. Following the rise to power of the Nazi Party in 1933, she went into exile in the Netherlands.

Selected filmography
 Yellow Star (1922)
 Fratricide (1922)
 The Cigarette Countess (1922)
 Shame (1922)
 The Heart of Lilian Thorland (1924)
 The Morals of the Alley (1925)
 The Golden Butterfly (1926)
 Unmarried Daughters (1926)
 The Divorcée (1926)
 The Queen of the Baths (1926)
 Sword and Shield (1926)
 State Attorney Jordan (1926)
 Radio Magic (1927)
 The Woman with the World Record (1927)
 The Story of a Little Parisian (1928)
 A Girl with Temperament (1928)
 The Beloved of His Highness (1928)
 Who Invented Divorce? (1928)
 The Woman in the Advocate's Gown (1929)
 The Circus Princess (1929)
 Alarm at Midnight (1931)
 The Cross-Patch (1935)

References

Bibliography
 Taves, Brian. P.G. Wodehouse and Hollywood: Screenwriting, Satires and Adaptations. McFarland, 2006.

External links

1894 births
Year of death unknown
German screenwriters
German women screenwriters
Women film pioneers
Emigrants from Nazi Germany to the Netherlands
20th-century German women